Cuba competed at the 2020 Summer Paralympics in Tokyo, Japan, from 24 August to 5 September 2021.

Medalists

Competitors
Source:

Athletics 

Two Cuban athlete (Uliser Aguilera Cruz& Omara Durand) successfully to break through the qualifications for the 2020 Paralympics after breaking the qualification limit.

DQ: Disqualified | SB: Season Best | Q: Qualified by place or standard based on overall position after heats | DNM: Did not mark | DNA: Did not advance | N/A: Not available, stage was not contested | PB: Personal Best | WR: World Record | PR: Paralympic Record | AR: Area Record

Track

Field

Cycling 

Cuba sent one male cyclist after successfully getting a slot in the 2018 UCI Nations Ranking Allocation quota for the Americas.

FADT: Finish After Deadline Time

Judo

Powerlifting

Shooting

Swimming 

One Cuban swimmer has successfully entered the paralympic slot after breaking the MQS.

Table tennis

Cuba entered one athletes into the table tennis competition at the games. Yunier Fernández qualified from the 2019 Parapan American Games which was held in Lima, Peru.

Men

See also 
Cuba at the Paralympics
Cuba at the 2020 Summer Olympics

References 

Nations at the 2020 Summer Paralympics
2020
2021 in Cuban sport